Víctor Bernat Cuadros (born 17 May 1987) is an Andorran footballer who plays as a forward for UE Santa Coloma and the Andorra national team.

Career
Bernat made his international debut for Andorra on 6 September 2020 in the UEFA Nations League against the Faroe Islands.

Career statistics

International

International goals
Scores and results list Andorra's goal tally first.

References

External links
 
 
 
 NFT Profile

1987 births
Living people
Footballers from Barcelona
Andorran footballers
Andorra international footballers
Spanish footballers
Spanish people of Andorran descent
People with acquired Andorran citizenship
Association football forwards
UE Engordany players
UE Santa Coloma players
Primera Divisió players